The Indian Village Historic District is a national historic district located at Fort Wayne, Indiana.  The district encompasses 481 contributing buildings, 2 contributing sites, 1 contributing structure, and 6 contributing objects in a predominantly residential section of Fort Wayne. The area was developed from about 1925 to 1960, and includes notable examples of Tudor Revival, Mission Revival, and Modern Movement style residential architecture.

It was listed on the National Register of Historic Places in 2009.

References

Historic districts on the National Register of Historic Places in Indiana
Tudor Revival architecture in Indiana
Buildings and structures in Fort Wayne, Indiana
National Register of Historic Places in Fort Wayne, Indiana